The 1998 FIA GT Budapest 500 km was the fifth round the 1998 FIA GT Championship season.  It took place at the Hungaroring, Hungary, on July 19, 1998.

Due to a large accident on the first lap, the race was red flagged.  The initial start was nullified and the race was restarted, running for its full original distance.  Four cars which were damaged in the initial accident did not take the restart.

Official results
Class winners are in bold.  Cars failing to complete 70% of winner's distance are marked as Not Classified (NC).

Statistics
 Pole position – #1 AMG Mercedes – 1:28.562
 Fastest lap – #2 AMG Mercedes – 1:32.300
 Average speed – 149.062 km/h

References

 
 

B
Budapest 500